Ratnasabapathy Sri Pathmanathan (died 5 May 1943) was a Ceylon Tamil barrister-at-law, politician and member of the State Council of Ceylon.

Sri Pathmanathan was the nephew of P. Ramanathan and P. Arunachalam. He had a MA degree from the University of Oxford.

Sri Pathmanathan contested the 1934 State Council by-election in Point Pedro but was defeated by G. G. Ponnambalam. He contested the 1936 State Council election as a candidate in Mannar-Mullaitivu and was elected to the State Council of Ceylon. He died whilst still in office on 5 May 1943. His position on the Council was taken by Gnanamuthu Isaac, at the subsequent by-election on 28 August.

Electoral history

References

1943 deaths
Alumni of the University of Oxford
Coomaraswamy family
Members of the 2nd State Council of Ceylon
Members of the Inner Temple
People from Colombo
People from British Ceylon
Sri Lankan barristers
Sri Lankan Tamil lawyers
Sri Lankan Tamil politicians
Year of birth missing